Eucalyptus rigens, commonly known as saltlake mallee, is a species of sprawling mallee that is endemic to the southwest of Western Australia. It has smooth bark, lance-shaped adult leaves, flower buds in groups of three on a flattened peduncle and sessile, ribbed fruit.

Description
It has smooth grey over white bark that peels in strips. Flowering occurs from July to September and the flowers are creamy white.

Taxonomy and naming
Eucalyptus rigens was first formally described by the botanists Ian Brooker and Stephen Hopper in 1989 in the journal Nuytsia from material they collected in the Truslove Nature Reserve near Grass Patch. The specific epithet (rigens) is a Latin word meaning "stiff" or "rigid", referring to the leaves.

Distribution and habitat
Saltlake mallee grows in sandy soils around the edges of salt lakes, usually in mallee shrubland, to the north and north-east of Esperance.

Conservation status
This mallee is classified as "not threatened" by the Western Australian Government Department of Parks and Wildlife.

See also
List of Eucalyptus species

References

Eucalypts of Western Australia
rigens
Myrtales of Australia
Plants described in 1989
Mallees (habit)
Taxa named by Ian Brooker
Taxa named by Stephen Hopper